Quiet Weekend is a 1941 play by the British writer Esther McCracken. It opened on 2 July 1941 at Wyndham's Theatre in London's  West End, where it enjoyed a successful run of 1,059 performances, closing on 29 January 1944. The production was directed by Richard Bird and designed by Michael Relph. It was a sequel to the 1938 play Quiet Wedding.

Original West End cast
Adrian Barrasford - Frank Cellier
Arthur Royd -	George Thorpe
Bella Hitchins	- Helene Burls
Denys Royd	- Michael Wilding
Ella Spender - Dorothy Batley
Jim Brent - Geoffrey Denys
Marcia Brent - Gwynne Whitby
Mary Jerrow -	Gladys Boot
Mildred Royd - Marjorie Fielding
Miranda Bute -	Glynis Johns
Rowena Marriott -	Jeanne Stuart
Sally Spender	- Gabrielle Blunt
Sam Pecker	- Basil Mitchell

Adaptation

In 1946 it was turned into a film Quiet Weekend directed by Harold French.

References

Bibliography
 Chambers, Colin. Continuum Companion to Twentieth Century Theatre. Continuum, 2002.
 Wearing, J.P. The London Stage 1940-1949: A Calendar of Productions, Performers, and Personnel.  Rowman & Littlefield, 2014.

Plays by Esther McCracken
1941 plays
British plays adapted into films
West End plays